The Municipality of Grad is a municipality in Slovenia. The seat of the municipality is the village of Grad.

Settlements
In addition to the municipal seat of Grad, the municipality also includes the following settlements:
 Dolnji Slaveči
 Kovačevci
 Kruplivnik
 Motovilci
 Radovci
 Vidonci

References

External links

Municipality of Grad on Geopedia

 
Grad
1998 establishments in Slovenia